Windamere may refer to:

Windamere Hotel, Darjeeling, India
Windamere Dam, New South Wales, Australia

See also
Windemere (disambiguation)
Windermere (disambiguation)